Massachusetts's electoral law required a majority for election. In five districts this was not met on the first election, requiring additional trials to be held.

See also 
 1816 and 1817 United States House of Representatives elections
 List of United States representatives from Massachusetts

Notes 

United States House of Representatives elections in Massachusetts
Massachusetts
United States House of Representatives
Massachusetts
United States House of Representatives